La Poste du Bénin is the government organisation responsible for the post in Benin.

Benin has been a member of the Universal Postal Union since 27 April 1961 and is also a member of the West African Postal Conference.

See also 
Postage stamps and postal history of Benin

References

External links 

Ben
Postal system of Benin
Government of Benin